The Hochschule für Musik Freiburg (University of Music Freiburg or Freiburg Conservatory of Music) is a public music academy subsidized by the State of Baden-Württemberg for academic research and artistic and pedagogical training in music.

History
The Hochschule was initially founded as a municipal institution in 1946 under the direction of Gustav Scheck, but two years later became an institution of the State of Baden (part of Baden-Württemberg since 1952). The original facilities were two intact townhouses in Freiburg's largely destroyed city center. Many of the early students went on to become renowned musicians, including the tenor Fritz Wunderlich. Numerous outstanding instrumental soloists and teachers have taught at the Hochschule, including Harald Genzmer, Aurèle Nicolet, Ulrich Koch, Wolfgang Marschner, Ludwig Doerr, Carl Seemann, Erich and Elma Doflein, Edith Picht-Axenfeld and James Avery.

In 1954 Wolfgang Fortner founded the pioneering Institut für Neue Musik (Institute for New Music) at the Hochschule and later began a cooperation with the experimental electronic studio of the Heinrich-Strobel Foundation at the Freiburg branch of the Südwestfunks (now the Südwestrundfunk).

Following many years of being housed in numerous buildings throughout the city, the Hochschule erected a new state-of-the-art facility in 1983.

Since the fall of 2005, the Hochschule has collaborated with the Universitätsklinikum Freiburg (Freiburg University Hospital) through the newly founded "Freiburger Institut für Musikermedizin" (Freiburg Institute for Performing Arts Medicine) in order to research, teach, and promote specialized patient care based on the often overlooked connection between music making and health.

The Hochschule maintains international partnerships with the music conservatories in Odessa (Ukraine), Rochester (USA), Warsaw (Poland), Sydney and Kyoto (Japan).

Notable teachers and students
 Robert Aitken
 Stefan Ammer
 James Avery
 Tanja Ariane Baumgartner
 Maria Bengtsson (soprano)
 Harald Genzmer
 Bernd Glemser
 Gottfried von der Goltz
 Wilfried Gruhn
 Stanislav Heller
 Robert Hill
 Ernst Horn
 Robert D. Levin
 Éric Le Sage
 Aurèle Nicolet
 Heinz Holliger
 Edith Picht-Axenfeld
 Anthony Plog
 Wolfgang Rihm
 Linus Roth
 Tibor Szász
 Carl Ueter
 Jörg Widmann
 Christoph Wolff
 Fritz Wunderlich
 Hans Zender
 Simone Zgraggen

Courses of study
Since the beginning of the 2006/07 winter semester, the Hochschule was one of the first German music conservatories to provide most of its courses in line with the proposed European Bachelor/Master system.  
Bachelor/Master's degree
Diplom/Künstlerische Ausbildung (Artist Diploma)
Diplom/Musiklehrer (Music teacher diploma)
Music Education
Master of Music
Master of Performance
Master of Contemporary Music Performance
Advanced Studies Diploma
Soloist Diploma
Aufbaustudium Kirchenmusik A (Church Music)
Doctoral Studies

The Hochschule is divided organizationally into five institutes: new music, musical theater, historical performance practice, the Freiburg Institute for Performing Arts Medicine, and the Freiburg School for the Gifted.

References

External links

 
Music schools in Germany
Universities in Germany
Education in Freiburg im Breisgau
Universities and colleges in Baden-Württemberg
Educational institutions established in 1946
1946 establishments in Germany
Buildings and structures in Freiburg im Breisgau